Acacia buxifolia, commonly known as box-leaf wattle, is shrub species that is endemic to eastern Australia.

Description
The plant has an erect habit with glabrous, flattened and angled branchlets.

Taxonomy
The species was first formally described by the botanist Allan Cunningham in 1825 as part of the work On the Botany of the Blue Mountains. Geographical Memoirs on New South Wales. It was reclassified as Racosperma buxifolium in 1987 by Leslie Pedley and transferred back to genus Acacia in 2006.
Two subspecies are known;
 Acacia buxifolia subsp. buxifolia
 Acacia buxifolia subsp. pubiflora.

Distribution
The species occurs in dry sclerophyll forest, woodland or heath in Victoria, New South Wales and Queensland. It is typically found on hills, slopes and plains inland from the coast and grows in sandy, clay or loam soils.

References

buxifolia
Flora of New South Wales
Flora of Queensland
Flora of Victoria (Australia)
Fabales of Australia
Plants described in 1825
Taxa named by Allan Cunningham (botanist)